The United States Post Office, also known as the Federal Building, is a historic post office building located at Greenville, Pitt County, North Carolina.  It was designed by the Office of the Supervising Architect under the direction of Oscar Wenderoth and built in 1913–1914.  It is a two-story, five bay, Florintine Renaissance style stuccoed brick building on a limestone base. It has a low hip roof of terra cotta tile with overhanging eaves. The front facade features a three-bay loggia formed by arches with voluted keystones, springing from Tuscan order columns. This building served as the main post office for Greenville until 1969. It currently serves as a U.S. Courthouse.

It was added to the National Register of Historic Places in 1986.  It is located in the Greenville Commercial Historic District.

References

Greenville
Renaissance Revival architecture in North Carolina
Government buildings completed in 1914
Buildings and structures in Pitt County, North Carolina
National Register of Historic Places in Greenville, North Carolina
Historic district contributing properties in North Carolina